Lyman High School may refer to:

 Lyman High School (Florida), Longwood, Florida
 Lyman High School (South Dakota), Presho, South Dakota
 Lyman High School (Wyoming), Lyman, Wyoming

See also
 Lyman (disambiguation)